"The Death of a Soldier" is a poem from Wallace Stevens's first book
of poetry, Harmonium. The poem uses free verse to describe the death of a soldier.

Interpretation
The poem's longevity reinforces the naturalistic austerity
of its depiction of death. One interpretive viewpoint asks whether 
Stevens is writing  about any death, or rather, as Longenbach
asserts, the death of the soldier—"and not an ambiguously 'fictive' soldier but Eugène Lemercier [the young French painter killed in 1915 whose letters were collected as Lettres d'un soldat and read by Stevens in the summer of 1917]." Lemercier was the grandson of Irish artist Harriet Osborne O'Hagan. Longenbach claims that the poem's "utter bareness derives from the fact that Stevens was writing not about natural death ... but about a new kind of unnatural death, the daily death of thousands of soldiers on French battlefields."

One response to Longenbach's interpretation is to invoke Stevens's distinction between the true subject of a poem and the poetry of the subject, as he draws it in "The Irrational Element in Poetry".
Now, just as the choice of subject is unpredictable at the outset, so its development, after it has been chosen, is unpredictable. One is always writing about two things at the same time in poetry and it is this that produces the tension characteristic of poetry. One is the true subject and the other is the poetry of the subject.  
Then Lemercier's death would be the true subject, and the poetry of the subject would be anyone's death.

"The Death of a Soldier" and other works by Stevens lead Bates to describe Stevens as "a war poet, after his fashion", and Ramazani's "Stevens and the War Elegy" expands on that idea, especially as it relates to post-Harmonium poems that are informed by World War II.

Bates compares the poem to "The Snow Man",
particularly its final stanza, in which the snow man must be "nothing
himself" in order to behold "the nothing that is". In this respect
"The Death of a Soldier" adopts the snow man's point of view,
according to Bates. The soldier has a "Lockean mind":
"He is the sum of his impressions", Bates writes, "identical, in this
instance, with the nothing he does behold".
The soldier's "blank slate" (tabula rasa) becomes a
blank, so to speak, leaving the clouds to go in their direction. The poem marks a departure from Romantic and Victorian conceptions of death; Stevens does not personify death. Compare to Stevens’ treatment of death in "Invective Against Swans".

The analogy between death and the season of autumn supports the
interpretive idea that Stevens's care about the weather is interwoven
with reflections on deeper themes such as death and the nature of time.
(See the issue between Vendler and Bloom in the main
Harmonium essay, the section "The
musical Imagist".)

Buttel includes "The Death of a Soldier" as among a handful of
Harmonium poems that most notably anticipate the "more reflective,
more meditative, more serene, but no less intense" poems of Stevens' later work,
not excluding "those magnificent, direct, fervent and profound poems
in The Rock at the end—and possibly the summit—of his
career".

Notes

References 

 Bates, Milton J. Wallace Stevens: A Mythology of Self. 1985: University of California Press.
 Buttel, Robert. Wallace Stevens: The Making of Harmonium. 1967:
 Kermode, Frank and Joan Richardson. Stevens: Collected Poetry and Prose. 1997: Library of America
 Longenbach, James. Wallace Stevens: The Plain Sense of Things. 1991: Oxford University Press.
 Ramazani, Jahan. "Stevens and the War Elegy". Wallace Stevens Journal 15 1 (Spring 1991), pp. 24–36. Princeton University Press.

1918 poems
American poems
Poetry by Wallace Stevens